Oporno-Opytny Punkt is a rural locality (a village) in Zaostrovskoye Rural Settlement of Primorsky District, Arkhangelsk Oblast, Russia. The population was 10 as of 2010.

Geography 
Oporno-Opytny Punkt is located 16 km southwest of Arkhangelsk (the district's administrative centre) by road. Perkhachevo is the nearest rural locality.

References 

Rural localities in Primorsky District, Arkhangelsk Oblast